Pokrovka is a rural locality (a selo) in Pribaykalsky District, Republic of Buryatia, Russia. The population was 242 as of 2010. There are 3 streets.

Geography 
Pokrovka is located 26 km southwest of Turuntayevo (the district's administrative centre) by road. Ilyinka is the nearest rural locality.

References 

Rural localities in Okinsky District